Lewis Franklin Petrinovich (June 12, 1930 - July 28, 2021) was an American evolutionary psychologist and professor emeritus of psychology at the University of California, Riverside. His work has included research on lefthandedness, the potential evolutionary origins of cannibalism, and evolutionary ornithology.

Education
Petrinovich received his bachelor's degree from the University of Idaho in 1952 and his Ph.D. from the University of California, Berkeley in 1962.

References

1930 births
2021 deaths
Evolutionary psychologists
University of California, Riverside faculty
University of Idaho alumni
University of California, Berkeley alumni
American ornithologists